Rana Muhammad Akram Khan is a Pakistani lawyer and zamindar. He is former chairman executive of the Punjab Bar Council (PBC).

Education and background
Khan was born in Chiraghabad, Faisalabad (Pakistan). His family and relatives had migrated to Faisalabad during the 1947 Indian Partition from Kurali Village near Wonderland (Lambra) in Jalandhar. Khan's father Rana Mehar Khan was a hereditary zamindar of the Rajput background. Khan studied law at S. M. Law College and got both Bachelor of Laws and master's degree in political science from University of Karachi.

Punjab Bar Council election record
 In 2009, Khan was elected Member of the council for the term 2010–14. During this term he was further elected Chairman Executive of the council for 2010–11. he was elected to this office by having secured 44 votes of out of the total 75 members.
 In 2014, he was again elected as Member of the council for the term 2015–19.
 In 2020, Khan was once again elected as Member of the council for the term 2020–25.

Role against National Judicial Policy

Khan had a prominent role against the National Judicial Policy in Pakistan. He rebuffed the Supreme Court's National Judicial Policy criticising it as an execution of justice and also ended up ceasing the licenses of counsels who supported it. According to him, the policy was not delivering justice to people but rather only accelerating the process for disposing of the cases.

Boycott of policy 
Khan reiterated several times that National Judicial Policy is a liquidation of Justice, due to which the Punjab Bar Council had announced the weekly strike in Punjab on every Saturday. In Jaranwala the lawyers arranged a lavish dinner in his honour at Committee Bagh. Speaking on the occasion he said: “We have apprehensions towards National Judicial Policy which is not proper for the lawyers, judges and the public.” He appealed to the Chief Justice of Pakistan to review this policy, saying that, "We respect and honour judiciary and we enjoy cordial relations with bench and bar." Khan further elaborated addressing a joint meeting of Lahore Bar Association and Lahore High Court Bar Association that "We are not against the speedy disposal of cases but we take issue against pointless dismissals in the name of judicial policy. The courts should impose a fine when lawyers are deliberately avoiding court appearances and delaying cases. But when a genuine adjournment is requested, it should be granted".

Suspension of licenses 
Khan suspended the licenses of President, High Court Bar Association Rawalpindi, President, Rawalpindi District Bar Association and president of District and High Court Bar Association Multan for not observing strike according to the council's announcement against National Judicial Policy. In the rift, the executive of Rawalpindi District Bar Association (RDBA) announced strike against him. However RDBA Executive was criticized by lawyers of RDBA for going out of their limits.

References

External links

 PBC Executive Chairman Rana Muhammad Akram Khan said lawyers across the country would boycott the courts and hoist black flags over bar rooms in protest. Published by tribune in October 2010.
 Bar-bench standoff deepens 1,300 judicial officers resign; Published August 2010 at Awaztoday.com
 Pak lawyers touched by India’s warmth Published in August 2010 at Chandigarh, India.
 .ججز بحالی نوٹیفکیشن واپس لینے کا اقدام غیر آئینی، توہین عدالت ہوگی. Published on 17 Oct 2010 by www.nawaiwaqt.com

Pakistani lawyers
Living people
Punjabi people
Sindh Muslim Law College alumni
University of Karachi alumni
1962 births
Chairmen of the Punjab Bar Council
People from Lahore